Lisky is a village in Odesa Oblast, Ukraine. It belongs to Kiliia urban hromada, one of the hromadas of Ukraine.

Until 18 July 2020, Lisky belonged to Kiliia Raion. The raion was abolished in July 2020 as part of the administrative reform of Ukraine, which reduced the number of raions of Odesa Oblast to seven. The area of Kiliia Raion was merged into Izmail Raion.

References

Villages in Izmail Raion